Halifax—East Hants was a federal electoral district in the province of Nova Scotia, Canada, that was represented in the House of Commons of Canada from 1968 to 1979. The riding was created in 1966 from parts of Colchester—Hants riding. It consisted of the Municipality of East Hants in the county of Hants, and parts of the county of Halifax and the city of Halifax.

The electoral district was abolished in 1976 when it was redistributed between Annapolis Valley—Hants, Halifax and Halifax West ridings.

Members of Parliament

This riding has elected the following Members of Parliament:

Election results

By-election On Mr. McCleave's resignation, 9 December 1977

See also 

 List of Canadian federal electoral districts
 Past Canadian electoral districts

External links 
 Riding history for Halifax—East Hants (1966–1976) from the Library of Parliament

Former federal electoral districts of Nova Scotia